The 2015 SEC softball tournament will be held at Tiger Park on the campus of Louisiana State University in Baton Rouge, Louisiana from May 6 through May 9, 2015. The tournament will earn the Southeastern Conference's automatic bid to the 2015 NCAA Division I softball tournament. The Championship game will be broadcast on ESPN2 and the semifinals will be broadcast on ESPNU, while all other SEC tournament games will be live on the SEC Network.

In addition to the TV broadcast, the semifinals and championship will be available to listen to online and through select radio stations via the SEC Radio Network.

Tournament

  Vanderbilt does not sponsor a softball team.
All times listed are Central Daylight Time.

Schedule

References

SEC softball tournament
tournament